Kelsale is a village and former civil parish, now in the parish of Kelsale cum Carlton, in the East Suffolk district, in the county of Suffolk, England. It is located approximately 1 mile north of Saxmundham town centre at the junction of the B1121 and the A12. In 1881 the civil parish had a population of 973.

Notable buildings
In Kelsale village centre there is a former Guildhall built in 1495 that is now used as a training centre.

Kelsale has a primary school, Kelsale C of EVC Primary School, a Methodist Chapel and a Grade II* listed Village Hall and Social Club.

On the hill, the grade I listed Parish Church of St. Mary and St. Peter has a distinctive lych gate.  Inside there is an elaborate pulpit dated before 1631 and a statue of Samuel Clouting by Thomas Thurlow of Saxmundham.

References

Villages in Suffolk
Former civil parishes in Suffolk